Juan Alberto "Juancho" Hernangómez Geuer (born September 28, 1995) is a Spanish professional basketball player who last played for the Toronto Raptors  of the National Basketball Association (NBA). He previously played for Estudiantes of the Liga ACB, and has represented the senior Spain national team. He was selected by the Denver Nuggets with the 15th overall pick in the 2016 NBA draft and played for three and a half seasons with the team before being traded to the Minnesota Timberwolves. After spending one and a half seasons with the team in his seventh season, he had short stints with the Boston Celtics, San Antonio Spurs and Utah Jazz. He signed with Toronto Raptors in the 2022 off-season and also won the EuroBasket with his home country Spain.

Hernangómez co-starred in the Netflix basketball film Hustle in 2022 alongside Adam Sandler.

Early career
Hernangómez began playing competitive basketball in 2007, with the youth teams of CB Las Rozas. He joined a youth squad of Real Madrid and played with the team until moving to Club Baloncesto Majadahonda for the following years.

Professional career

CB Estudiantes (2012–2016)

In 2012, Hernangómez signed his first professional contract with CB Estudiantes and competed with their second team until 2014, when he was promoted to the main team. In 2015–16, Hernangómez averaged 9.7 points and 5.7 rebounds in 34 games. He was subsequently named the recipient of the ACB Best Young Player Award.

Denver Nuggets (2016–2020)
On April 26, 2016, Hernangómez was named in the international early entry candidates list for the 2016 NBA draft. He was selected by the Denver Nuggets with the 15th overall pick. On August 9, 2016, he signed his rookie scale contract with the Nuggets. On January 4, 2017, he was assigned to the Sioux Falls Skyforce of the NBA Development League, pursuant to the flexible assignment rule. He was recalled by the Nuggets three days later after appearing in one game for the Skyforce. On February 13, 2017, he scored a season-high 27 points to go with a season-best 10 rebounds in a 132–110 win over the Golden State Warriors. He hit six three-pointers against the Warriors to help the Nuggets tie an NBA record with 24 three-pointers. Early in the 2017–18 season, Hernangomez was diagnosed with mononucleosis, and as a result, he played in only 25 games during his sophomore campaign.

Minnesota Timberwolves (2020–2021)
On February 5, 2020, Hernangómez was traded to the Minnesota Timberwolves.

He re-signed with the Timberwolves on a three year deal on November 27, 2020. The 2020–21 season was a tumultuous one for Hernangómez as he showed up to training camp out of shape, contracted COVID-19, and lost his spot in the starting lineup, capped off by a falling out with the Timberwolves front office over their decision to disallow him from participating in the 2021 Olympics after suffering a shoulder injury during an exhibition game.

Boston Celtics (2021–2022) 
On August 25, 2021, Hernangómez and Jarrett Culver were traded to the Memphis Grizzlies in exchange for Patrick Beverley and on September 15, he was traded to the Boston Celtics in exchange for Kris Dunn, Carsen Edwards and the right for a 2026 second-round pick swap.

San Antonio Spurs (2022) 
On January 19, 2022, Hernangómez was traded to the San Antonio Spurs in a three-team trade involving the Denver Nuggets, sending Bol Bol and PJ Dozier to Boston and Bryn Forbes to Denver.

Utah Jazz (2022) 
On February 9, 2022, Hernangómez was traded to the Utah Jazz in a three-team trade. On June 30, he was waived by the Jazz.

Toronto Raptors (2022–2023) 

On July 27, 2022, Hernangómez signed a one-year contract with the Toronto Raptors for an amount equal to the veteran's minimum. On February 28, 2023, he was waived by the Raptors.

National team career

Junior national team
In 2013, Hernangómez competed with the Spain national under-18 basketball team at the FIBA Europe Under-18 Championship in Latvia. He joined the under-20 team for the following two years, playing at the FIBA Europe Under-20 Championship. Hernangómez also helped the senior Spain national team practice for the EuroBasket 2015.

Senior national team
His senior Spain national team major tournament debut was at the EuroBasket 2017. Hernangomez averaged 8.4 points, 5.9 rebounds, 0.7 assists and 0.7 blocked shots in 19.7 minutes per game. Spain finished in third place, winning the bronze medal.

In June 2018, Hernangomez was again named to the Spain national team's roster in advance of the first stage of qualifiers for the 2019 FIBA World Cup.

Hernangómez and Spain won a surprising gold medal at EuroBasket 2022. In the final against France, Hernangómez scored 27 points including seven three-pointers to guide Spain to a convincing win. He was third on the team in scoring (12.8 points per game) and third in rebounding as well (5.0 per game). His brother Willy was also on the team and won tournament MVP honours.

Career statistics

NBA

Regular season

|-
| style="text-align:left;"|
| style="text-align:left;"|Denver
| 62 || 9 || 13.6 || .451 || .407 || .750 || 3.0 || .5 || .5 || .2 || 4.9
|-
| style="text-align:left;"|
| style="text-align:left;"|Denver
| 25 || 3 || 11.1 || .387 || .280 || .833 || 2.2 || .5 || .2 || .1 || 3.3
|-
| style="text-align:left;"|
| style="text-align:left;"|Denver
| 70 || 25 || 19.4 || .439 || .365 || .767 || 3.8 || .8 || .4 || .3 || 5.8
|-
| style="text-align:left;" rowspan="2"|
| style="text-align:left;"|Denver
| 34 || 0 || 12.4 || .345 || .250 || .640 || 2.8 || .6 || .1 || .1 || 3.1
|-
| style="text-align:left;"|Minnesota
| 14 || 14 || 29.4 || .453 || .420 || .609 || 7.3 || 1.3 || 1.0 || .3 || 12.9
|-
| style="text-align:left;"|
| style="text-align:left;"|Minnesota
| 52 || 6 || 17.3 || .435 || .327 || .619 || 3.9 || .7 || .4 || .1 || 7.2
|-
| style="text-align:left;" rowspan="3"|
| style="text-align:left;"|Boston
| 18 || 0 || 5.3 || .185 || .167 || .667 || 1.4 || .2 || .2 || .1 || 1.1
|-
| style="text-align:left;"|San Antonio
| 5 || 0 || 10.2 || .333 || .000 || .750 || 3.0 || .6 || .2 || .2 || 1.4
|-
| style="text-align:left;"|Utah
| 17 || 9 || 17.5 || .507 || .438 || .476 || 3.5 || .8 || .4 || .5 || 6.2
|-
| style="text-align:left;"|
| style="text-align:left;"|Toronto
| 42 || 10 || 14.6 || .421 || .254 || .563 || 2.9 || .6 || .4 || .1 || 2.9
|- class="sortbottom"
| style="text-align:center;" colspan="2"|Career
| 339 || 76 || 15.5 || .428 || .342 || .676 || 3.3 || .6 || .4 || .2 || 5.0

Playoffs

|-
| style="text-align:left;"| 
| style="text-align:left;"| Denver
| 5 || 0 || 2.9 || .333 || .500 || — || .6 || .0 || .0 || .0 || .6
|-
| style="text-align:left;"| 
| style="text-align:left;"| Utah
| 6 || 0 || 9.3 || .278 || .333 || — || 2.0 || .8 || .3 || .0 || 2.3
|- class="sortbottom"
| style="text-align:center;" colspan="2"|Career
| 11 || 0 || 6.5 || .286 || .357 || — || 1.4 || .5 || .2 || .0 || 1.5

Player profile
Hernangómez's style of play has drawn comparisons to NBA players Víctor Claver and Jonas Jerebko. He has been praised for his speed, athleticism, and approximately 7 ft (2.13 m) wingspan. The duo of him and his brother, Willy, have also been compared to Spanish NBA stars Marc and Pau Gasol.

Acting career
Hernangómez made his acting debut in the Netflix film Hustle, produced by LeBron James and Adam Sandler, who is also the co-star. The film was released on June 8, 2022.

Personal life
Hernangómez's immediate family is made up of former or current basketball players. His older brother Willy currently plays for the New Orleans Pelicans, having previously played for Real Madrid. His mother Margarita Geuer Draeger was an international basketball player, winning a European championship with Spain in 1993. His father also played for Real Madrid and Estudiantes and his younger sister currently plays for Estudiantes' youth team.

References

External links

 Juan Hernangómez at acb.com
 Juancho Hernangomez at FIBA
 

1995 births
Living people
2019 FIBA Basketball World Cup players
Basketball players from Madrid
Boston Celtics players
CB Estudiantes players
Denver Nuggets draft picks
Denver Nuggets players
FIBA Basketball World Cup-winning players
Minnesota Timberwolves players
National Basketball Association players from Spain
Power forwards (basketball)
San Antonio Spurs players
Sioux Falls Skyforce players
Spanish expatriate basketball people in Canada
Spanish expatriate basketball people in the United States
Spanish men's basketball players
Spanish people of German descent
Toronto Raptors players
Utah Jazz players